Monasterace-Stilo (Italian: Stazione di Monasterace-Stilo) is a railway station in Monasterace, Italy. The station is located on the Jonica railway . The train services are operated by Trenitalia.

Train services
The station is served by the following service(s):

Intercity services Taranto - Sibari - Crotone - Catanzaro Lido - Roccella Jonica - Reggio Calabria
Regional services (Treno regionale) Catanzaro Lido - Roccella Jonica - Reggio di Calabria

References

Railway stations in Calabria
Monasterace
Buildings and structures in the Province of Reggio Calabria